Pittsburg is a city and the county seat of Camp County, Texas, United States. Best known as the former home of the giant poultry producer Pilgrim's and the home of racing legend Carroll Shelby, Pittsburg is also the birthplace of Cavender's Boot City. In 1902, it was the site of an early flight attempt by the Ezekiel Air Ship Mfg Co. With a 2020 census-tabulated population of 4,335, it is the most populous city in Camp County.

Etymology
The city is named after the family of William Harrison Pitts. In 1996, the town changed its name to "Cowboys" for a few weeks in support of the Dallas Cowboys, who faced the Pittsburgh Steelers that year in Super Bowl XXX.

Geography 

Pittsburg is located at 32°59'49" North, 94°58'5" West (32.997029, –94.968044).

The climate in this area is characterized by hot, humid summers and generally mild to cool winters. According to the Köppen climate classification, Pittsburg has a humid subtropical climate, Cfa on climate maps.

Demographics 

As of the census of 2000, 4,347 people, 1,593 households, and 1,056 families ved inin the city. The population density was 1,301.9 people per square mile (502.5/km). The 1,779 housing units had an average density of 532.8 per square mile (205.7/km). The racial makeup of the city was 54.50% White, 27.97% African American, 0.30% Native American, 0.16% Asian, 0.05% Pacific Islander, 15.76% from other races, and 1.27% from two or more races. About 23.86% of the population were Hispanics or Latinos of any race. As of the 2020 United States census, its population was 4,335; according to the American Community Survey in 2020, 34.3% of the population was non-Hispanic White, 30.9% Black or African American, 0.2% American Indian and Alaska Native, 1.8% multiracial, and 32.8% Hispanic or Latino of any race. These statistics reflected nationwide demographic trends of diversification.

In 2000, the median income for a household in the city was $24,789, and for a family was $28,398. Males had a median income of $28,750 versus $20,042 for females. The per capita income for the city was $14,882. 27.7% of the population and 23.8% of families were below the poverty line. Out of the total population, 38.8% of those under the age of 18 and 14.1% of those 65 and older were living below the poverty line. In 2020, the median household income grew to $48,340.

Education
The city of Pittsburg is served by the Pittsburg Independent School District and home to the Pittsburg High School Pirates.

Notable people

 Barbara Smith Conrad, opera singer (Vienna State Opera and the Metropolitan Opera Company)
 Louie Gohmert, politician, Republican U.S. Representative from Texas's 1st congressional district
 Mildred Fay Jefferson, first Black woman to graduate from Harvard Medical School and national prolife leader
 Homer Jones, professional football wide receiver (New York Giants and Cleveland Browns)
 Frank P. Lockhart served as US Consul General and Counsellor in China.
 Ernie McAnally, professional baseball player, Montreal Expos 1971–1974
 Ken Reeves (American football), offensive tackle for Texas A&M University and NFL's Philadelphia Eagles (1985–1989) and Cleveland Browns (1990)
 Carroll Shelby, racing and automotive designer and former driver
 Lonnie "Bo" Pilgrim, founder of Pilgrim's Pride

 Kendall Wright, wide receiver for Baylor and NFL's Tennessee Titans, Chicago Bears
 Jeremy Loyd, LineBacker for Iowa State University and NFL's St. Louis Rams
 Koe Wetzel, country/southern rock singer

Notes

References

External links
 Official City Web Site
 Northeast Texas Rural Heritage Center and Museum

Cities in Camp County, Texas
Cities in Texas
County seats in Texas